Caribbean Carnival/Friends Of Culture (Friends Of Culture) was registered as a 501(c)3 non-profit organization in Louisiana, June 21, 2001.  Its founder, president, and CFO is Marilyn C. LaForce, a native of St. Lucia.  One of the main goals of the organization is to provide a cultural link between the Greater New Orleans area and the island nations of the Caribbean.  Under Ms. Laforces's leadership (FOC) is the producer and promoter of Bayou Bacchanal, the original Caribbean Carnival in New Orleans and the premier Caribbean organization within the state.  January 2020, FOC registered as a DBA, producing our second festival, "Curry With A Flavor".

The Carnival is one of the many unique events of New Orleans.  The most remarkable features of Bayou Bacchanal are the masqueraders who dance through the city streets to the pulsating beats of steel pan drums, which are indigenous instruments of Trinidad and Tobago.  Moreover, Bayou Bacchanal, like other Caribbean carnivals, encourages full participation for visitors in the parade who normally dress in exotic-islander costumes, but it is not required.  Anyone may join the parade as it snakes its way to Crescent Park to finish the carnival with concerts, authentic Caribbean cuisine, arts and crafts.

Bayou Bacchanal is only one stop for the carnival lovers.  Throughout the year, party goers will follow the Caribbean party to cities all over North America.  For example, a group of people may participate in the Caribbean carnival in Toronto, Ontario, Canada, drive to Atlanta, Georgia for another, afterward leave to Miami, Florida's event and then make a final stop in New Orleans, Louisiana for Bayou Bacchanal.  Every year almost every major city in North America holds a Caribbean carnival.

Bayou Bacchanal takes place every first Saturday of November where the weather is near perfect in New Orleans for outside activities.

External links
 The official website of Curry With A Flavor Festival
 The official website of Bayou Bacchanal
 Video of Bayou Bacchanal 2003
 Video of Bayou Bacchanal 2004
 History of the Caribbean festival

Caribbean-American history
Festivals in New Orleans
Trinidadian and Tobagonian-American culture
Carnivals in the United States